Diwan Bahadur Sir Gopathi Narayanaswami Chetty   (28 September 1881 – 13 June 1950) was an Indian merchant, landlord, politician, legislator and economist.

Early life 

Narayanaswami Chetty was born into the Gopathi balija family. He was the son of Gopathy Mahadeva Chetty. He was educated in Madras. He was an elected President of Madras Corporation.

Public life 

Narayanaswamy Chetty served as the member of the Council of State, Imperial Legislative Council of India, from 1930 to 1936. He also served as a President of the Madras Corporation. He was a member of the Joint Select Committee of the Reserve Bank of India Bill and played a pivotal role in the formation of the Reserve Bank of India.

Honours 

Narayanaswamy Chetty was made a Companion of the Order of the Indian Empire in 1929 and a Knights Bachelor in 1945.

G. N. Chetty road in T. Nagar, Chennai is named after Gopathi Narayanaswami Chetty.

References

Knights Bachelor
Companions of the Order of the Indian Empire
Indian Knights Bachelor
Businesspeople from Chennai
Members of the Imperial Legislative Council of India
1881 births
1950 deaths
Indian merchants
Dewan Bahadurs
Indian landlords
Members of the Council of State (India)
Businesspeople in British India